Takia Sheikhan is a village located in Union Council Ghari Phulgran, Tehsil Havelian, District Abbottabad and KPK province.

The majority of the population belongs to the Barech Pashtun tribe.
They have descended from Qandhar.

General Info
It is a village with lush lands and mountains with road passing through the geart of the village.

Political Views
General public almost voted for pmln for the last 15 years. But now people also vote for the ruling pakistan tehreek i insaaf .

Languages
A large population of Takia Sheikhan speaks Hindko and Urdu,
The Ancient talks In Pashto.

Transport
Takia Sheikhan's main public transport consist of auto rickshaws, modified Suzuki pickup vehicles, tongas, which can accommodate anywhere from 8 to 13 people at a time. Taxis and automobiles for hire are also available. Vans and buses are frequently used for connecting Takia Sheikhan to the surrounding cities and towns in the region.

Mosque
There is a central mosque namely Jameah Ali-Ul-Murtaza Mosque.

Play Grounds
The village is blessed with a plain land having 2 cricket stadiums , a football ground and a volleyball ground.

Schools
There is a higher secondary school for Boys and Two separate primary schools for girls and boys.

References

External links
Facebook page

Union councils of Abbottabad District

fr:Ghari Phulgran